The Provincial Council of Groningen, also known as the States of Groningen, is the provincial council of Groningen, Netherlands. It forms the legislative body of the province. Its 43 seats are distributed every four years in provincial elections.

Current composition
Since the 2019 provincial elections, the distribution of seats of the Provincial Council of Groningen has been as follows:

See also
 Provincial politics in the Netherlands

References

External links

  

Politics of Groningen (province)
Groningen